Morris College (MC) is a private, Baptist historically black college in Sumter, South Carolina. It was founded and is operated by the Baptist Educational and Missionary Convention of South Carolina.

History 
Morris College was founded in 1908 by James J. Durham, initially as a grade school, high school, and college. The college is named after the Reverend Frank Morris because of his outstanding leadership throughout the African American community of South Carolina. The college's first president was Dr. Edward M. Brawley (1908–1912). Morris College awarded its first bachelor's degree in 1915 under the administration of the college's second president Dr. John Jacob Starks. The college's third president was Ira David Pinson, who steered the college to expansion during the Great Depression.

The college's longest-serving president was Dr. Luns C. Richardson, who served from 1974 to July 2017. The current president is Dr. Leroy Staggers, who formerly served as the college's academic dean.

Academics 
Morris College offers bachelor's degrees in 20 areas of study. The college is accredited by the Southern Association of Colleges and Schools to award four different types of bachelor's degrees: Bachelor of Arts, Bachelor of Fine Arts, Bachelor of Science, and Bachelor of Science in Education.

To effectively accomplish the purpose and philosophy of Morris College, its academic programs are organized into five academic divisions which oversee their respective departments.

Division of General Studies 
 The Division of General Studies allows students to develop a solid academic foundation before entering their major fields.
 Honors Program

Division of Business Administration 
 Business Administration
 Organizational Management Program

Division of Education 
 Early Childhood Education
 Elementary Education
 Secondary Education

Division of Religion, Humanities and Social Sciences 

 Mass Communications
 Pastoral Ministry
 Christian Education
 English
 Liberal Studies
 English/Secondary Education
 Criminal Justice
 History
 Political Science
 Sociology
 Social Studies/Secondary Education

Division of Natural Sciences and Mathematics 
 Biology
 Biology/Secondary Education
 Mathematics
 Mathematics/Secondary Education

Student life

Greek letter organizations
The university currently has chapters for eight of the nine National Pan-Hellenic Council organizations.

Athletics
The Morris athletics teams are called the Hornets. The college is a member of the National Association of Intercollegiate Athletics (NAIA), primarily competing as an independent within the Continental Athletic Conference since the 2005–06 academic year. The Hornets previously competed in the defunct Eastern Intercollegiate Athletic Conference (EIAC) from 1983–84 to 2004–05 (when the conference dissolved).

Morris competes in six intercollegiate varsity sports: Men's sports include baseball, basketball and track & field; while women's sports include basketball, softball and volleyball.

Notable alumni

See also 
 List of historically black colleges of the United States

References

External links
 
 Official athletics website

 
Education in Sumter County, South Carolina
Educational institutions established in 1908
Universities and colleges accredited by the Southern Association of Colleges and Schools
Buildings and structures in Sumter County, South Carolina
1908 establishments in South Carolina